Construction Equipment is a trade publication and web site serving the information needs of construction contractors, materials producers, and other owners and operators of construction equipment. It is headquartered in Arlington Heights, Illinois.
 
Established in 1949, Construction Equipment is published monthly. Each issue typically includes product evaluations and buying file as new products are introduced into the market. In addition, the magazine covers fleet-management topics, including the monthly column equipment executive.

Every December, Construction Equipment ranks new products introduced that year in a feature called Top 100 new products. 

As of June 2013, total BPA circulation was 76,030 subscribers.

In 2010, former owner Reed Business Information sold the magazine to MB Media. MB Media was acquired by Scranton Gillette Communications forming a sister company called SGC Horizon, LLC.

References

External links

Business magazines published in the United States
Monthly magazines published in the United States
Engineering magazines
Magazines established in 1949
Magazines published in Chicago
Professional and trade magazines